The Alfa Romeo 147 (Type 937) is a small family car produced by the Italian automaker Alfa Romeo from 2000 to 2010. The 147 was voted European Car of the Year in 2001.

The 147 was launched at the Turin Motor Show in June 2000 as a replacement for the Alfa Romeo 145 and 146 hatchbacks and is based on the running gear of the larger 156 saloon. It was sold with 1.6, 2.0, and 3.2-liter petrol engines, and a 1.9-liter diesel engine. A paddle-operated Selespeed automatic transmission was available from launch.

Two trim levels, Turismo and Lusso were available, and the 147 was the first Alfa Romeo to have dual-zone climate control and electronic traction control. In production for ten years, the 147 was one of the oldest small family cars on sale in Europe at the time of its replacement, reaching a production figure of 651,823.

Styling

The 147 was designed by Walter de Silva and Wolfgang Egger. The 147 received praise for its styling on launch, later it won styling awards. The 147 range was revamped in 2004, with the exterior styling changed to resemble the new 159 and Brera models, and Alfa Romeo Visconti concept car. The 147 had a drag coefficient (Cd) of 0.32.

Launch
In 1999, Alfa Romeo confirmed that it would replace its 145/146 hatchbacks with an all-new model, which was unveiled as the 147 at the Turin Motor Show in June 2000.  The first deliveries were in October 2000 in left-hand drive markets, and the right-hand-drive UK versions shortly thereafter. It received the 2001 European Car of the Year award.

Development

The 147 was facelifted at the end of 2004: new front grille, new headlights, new rear lights, and the interior was changed on all models besides the GTA version. A more powerful diesel engine arrived and the suspension was also tweaked. 

In 2006, the 147 1.9 JTD Q2 version was launched, with a front Torsen limited slip differential. Alfa Romeo presented a new limited edition 147 called Ducati Corse at the 2007 Bologna Motor Show. The car had a JTD diesel engine and Q2, a front Torsen limited slip differential.

The 147 was replaced by the Giulietta in May 2010.

High performance versions

The hot hatch 147 GTA model was launched in 2002. It has a widened body (15 mm at each side) to accommodate the 225/45R17 tyres. 

Most models have six-speed manual transmissions; whilst a smaller number of other models use the Selespeed automated manual system. In total, 5,029 147 GTAs were built, 1004 of which were Selespeeds.

London-based after market tuner Autodelta has produced a "bored out" version of the GTA, sporting a 3.7 litre V6, producing , and a split axle differential gear for the front wheels. Autodelta has also made a Rotrex supercharged version, producing .

Engines

Connect
Connect is an onboard information system: an onboard telematics system located in the central console that via its  monitor gave access to satellite navigation and hands free GSM phone as well as allowing the user to adjust radio and CD player settings.

Reception

The handling of 147 was praised in some reviews, in spite of criticism regarding the light (sensitive) steering, which makes some drivers feel less involved. However, light steering does help during parking maneuvers. Other criticisms of the 147 included a cumbersome gearshift, unsupportive seats, and the lack of interior space compared to its rivals. 

The car was noted for its pleasant engine note. The 147 suffers from fairly poor resale value in Great Britain. 

The 147 GTA and 147 Autodelta GTA have been road tested by Jeremy Clarkson, and featured on television show Top Gear, with a power lap around the track by The Stig. In his review of Autodelta 147 GTA car for The Sunday Times, Clarkson described the acceleration as "Ferrari throttle? Forget it. When you stamp on the accelerator it's like you've hit the Millennium Falcon's hyperdrive.

Awards

The Alfa Romeo 147 won over twenty awards including:
The European Car of the Year in 2001;
Das Goldene Lenkrad ("The golden steering wheel", BILD am SONNTAG – Germany) in 2000;
Auto Europa 1 (Panel of engineers, drivers, and journalists headed by Auto Bild – Germany) in 2001;
Trophées du design (Automobile Magazine – France)  in 2000; and
Carro Importado do Ano no Brasil – (Brazil Import Car of the Year) in 2002.

Motorsport

In Europe, there was a one-car racing series, European Alfa 147 Challenge for Alfa 147 Cup race cars starting from 2003. In 2005, this series ran alongside the World Touring Car Championship, winner of the season of 2005 was Irish driver Eoin Murray. The car used on the series was the Alfa 147 Cup producing  from its straight-4 1970 cc Twin Spark engine.

An 147 2.0 TS (200 bhp) was used by Czech rally driver Martin Rada, finishing second in N3 group (21st overall) on Rally Monte Carlo in 2009, and later finishing first in group 8 on Rally Monte Carlo 2012 (42nd overall) 

The 147 also competed briefly in the British Touring Car Championship in 2001 with the JSM team, with a best finish of 3rd at Oulton Park, thanks to driver/team owner Tim Harvey. The car won the 2003 and 2004 Italian Superturismo Championship and won the Super Production class of the 2005 European Touring Car Cup with driver Lorenzo Falessi.

References

External links

Internet Movie Cars Database: Alfa Romeo 147 in movies and TV series

147
Euro NCAP small family cars
Front-wheel-drive vehicles
Hot hatches
Sport compact cars
Cars introduced in 2000
Cars discontinued in 2010
2010s cars